The Babylonian Chronicles are a series of tablets recording major events in Babylonian history. They are thus one of the first steps in the development of ancient historiography. The Babylonian Chronicles were written in Babylonian cuneiform, from the reign of Nabonassar up to the Parthian Period, by Babylonian astronomers ("Chaldaeans"), who probably used the Astronomical Diaries as their source.

Almost all of the tablets were identified as chronicles once in the collection of the British Museum, having been acquired via antiquities dealers from unknown excavations in the 19th century. All but three of the chronicles are unprovenanced.

The Chronicles provide the "master narrative" for large tracts of current Babylonian history.

Discovery and publication
The chronicles are thought to have been transferred to the British Museum after 19th century excavations in Babylon, and subsequently left undeciphered in the archives for decades. The first chronicle to be published was BM 92502 (ABC1) in 1887 by Theophilus Pinches under the title "The Babylonian Chronicle". This was followed in 1923 by the publication of the Fall of Nineveh Chronicle (ABC 3), in 1924 by Sidney Smith's publication of the Esarhaddon Chronicle (ABC 14), the Akitu Chronicle (ABC 16) and the Nabonidus Chronicle (ABC 7), and in 1956 by Donald Wiseman's publication of four further tablets including the Nebuchadnezzar Chronicle (ABC 5).

Chronicles

Numbering systems 
ABC – A.K. Grayson, Assyrian and Babylonian Chronicles (1975)

CM – Jean-Jacques Glassner, Chroniques Mésopotamiennes (1993) (translated as Mesopotamian Chronicles, 2004)

BCHP – I. Finkel & R.J. van der Spek, Babylonian Chronicles of the Hellenistic Period (not yet published)

BM – British Museum Number

List

See also
 List of artifacts significant to the Bible
 Chronology of the ancient Near East

References

Literature
 Leo Oppenheim's translation of the Nabonidus Chronicle can be found in J. B. Pritchard (ed.) Ancient Near Eastern Texts Relating to the Old Testament (= ANET; 1950, 1955, 1969).
 The standard edition is A.K. Grayson, Assyrian and Babylonian Chronicles (= ABC; 1975).
 A translation of Chronicle 25, discovered after the publication of ABC, was published by C.B.F. Walker "Babylonian Chronicle 25: A Chronicle of the Kassite and Isin Dynasties", in G. van Driel e.a. (eds.): Zikir Šumim: Assyriological Studies Presented to F.R. Kraus on the Occasion of His Seventieth Birthday (= Fs. Kraus; 1982).
 John Brinkman revises Grayson's reading of ABC 1 in: "The Babylonian Chronicle revisited" in T. Abusch,  J. Huehnergard, P. Steinkeller (eds.): Lingering over Words. Studies in Ancient Near Eastern literature in Honor of William L. Moran (1990 Atlanta).
 Fragments of the chronicles that are relevant to the study of the Bible, can be found in William W. Hallo (ed.), The Context of Scripture, volume 1 (2003 Leiden and Boston). This book also contains the Weidner Chronicle.
 A recent update of ABC is Jean-Jacques Glassner, Mesopotamian Chronicles (= CM; 2004, ; French version 1993).
 An even more recent update of ABC is Amélie Kuhrt, The Persian Empire: A Corpus of Sources of the Achaemenid Period (Routledge, 2007).
 The publication of I. Finkel & R. J. van der Spek, Babylonian Chronicles of the Hellenistic Period (= BCHP) has been announced.
 An exposition that the Babylonian Chronicle should be regarded as a literary interpretation of the past in Waerzeggers, Caroline. "Writing History Under Empire: The Babylonian Chronicle Reconsidered", Journal of Ancient Near Eastern History, vol. 8, no. 1-2, 2021, pp. 279-317.

External links
 Mesopotamian Chronicles, all Assyrian and Babylonian Chronicles
 Assyrian and Babylonian Chronicles, and King Lists
 Babylonian chronicles: literature, a list of relevant secondary literature
 Synchronistic King List, Assyrian King List: translations and bibliographies
 Cuneiform sources for the history of Hellenistic Babylonia. Edition and Analysis: information about the BCHP Project

8th-century BC works
7th-century BC works
6th-century BC works
5th-century BC works
19th-century archaeological discoveries
Babylonia
Mesopotamian chronicles
Akkadian inscriptions
Clay tablets
Neo-Babylonian Empire